The Japan Foundation Awards honor individuals and organizations for  significant contributions to "the enhancement of mutual understanding between Japan and other countries."

History
Activities in an academic or cultural field have been presented by the Japan Foundation annually since 1973.

In 1985, Eleanor Harz Jorden was the first woman to receive a Japan Foundation Award.

In 2020, the award selection that continued for forty seven years was canceled for the first time due to COVID-19 pandemic. However, the nominated application for that year was carried over to the following year, and in 2021 four recipients were listed since 1973.

Description
The awards help to further the mission of the foundation in language and culture.

Two types of awards (the Japan Foundation Awards and the Japan Foundation Special Prizes) previously composed the Japan Foundation Awards. But these awards are integrated into “The Japan Foundation Awards” in three categories: "Arts and Culture", "Japanese Language", and "Japanese Studies and Intellectual Exchange" from 2008.

Recipients

Japan Foundation Awards

Special Prizes 
From 1974 to 2007, Special Prizes have been conferred, supplementing the list of those recognized by the Foundation.

Notes

References
 Ager, Dennis. (2001). Motivation in Language Planning and Language Policy. Clevedon: Multilingual Matters. ; ;  OCLC 248189692

External links
Full list of recipients

Japanese awards
Awards established in 1973